Imparja National News was an Australian regional television news program broadcast on Imparja Television.

History
Imparja introduced a local news service (primarily covering the Alice Springs area) into its nightly simulcast of National Nine News in 1990. Subsequently, the bulletin expanded into a full half-hour program incorporating local, national and international news. The program was directed at Indigenous and non-Indigenous viewers, but found a wide audience among Australians interested in Indigenous Australian issues, as such topics are rarely covered in the mainstream Australia media.

In 2005, Imparja National News was cancelled in anticipation of the network's license area being merged with that of Darwin. Regulations imposed by the Australian Communications and Media Authority relating to minimum levels of local news coverage led to the bulletin's revival in February 2006 with Ryan Liddle.

Two years later, the bulletin was cancelled again and replaced by short one-minute updates broadcast throughout the day. A short-lived weekly current affairs program, Footprints, was also introduced. As of 2009, Imparja now airs the Brisbane and Darwin editions of Nine News at 6 pm and 6:30 pm (AEST) respectively.

Imparja National News was replaced by National Nine News as at July 2016.

Anchors
 1990-1996: Livinia Hampton or Kerrynne Liddle
 1996 – Mid 1998: Catherine Liddle
 Mid 1998 – July 2003: Mervyn Castillon or Catherine Liddle
 July 2003 – March 2004: Mervyn Castillon or Stephanie Smail
 March 2004 – May 2005: Mervyn Castillon, Ryan Liddle or Stephanie Smail
 May 2005 – June 2007: Ryan Liddle
 June 2007 – November 2012: Ryan Liddle or Catherine Liddle
 December 2012 – February 2014: Lauren Crawley or Claire McGrath
 February 2014 – July 2016: Emma Groves

Indigenous Australian television series
Australian television news shows
1990 Australian television series debuts
2000s Australian television series
2016 Australian television series endings